Salix subopposita, also known as the opposite-leaved willow, is a species of willow native to southern Japan and Jeju Island in South Korea. It is a deciduous small shrub with a maximum height of 0.5 meters.

References 

subopposita